Daniel Lucio da Silveira (25 November 1982) is a former military police officer and Brazilian politician, affiliated with the PTB. He had been a federal deputy for Rio de Janeiro from 2019 to 2023.

Silveira was arrested on 16 February 2021, after publishing a video with an apology for AI-5 and attacks on ministers of the Federal Supreme Court.

Biography and political trajectory

Daniel Silveira, born in Petrópolis, was a bus collector, between 23 December 2006, and 17 January 2007, obtained false certificates for missing work and was prosecuted for falsehood, shortly thereafter, he took a contest for the Military Police of the State of Rio de Janeiro, thanks to the falsehood process, Silveira was disapproved, in 2011, for social research. In 2014, it was fully incorporated after appealing in court, in 2016, the process expired and the case closed.

Silveira was military police of Rio de Janeiro between 2012 and 2018. 
While still a policeman, he said he would like to shoot a protestor against Jair Bolsonaro
 and received 60 disciplinary sanctions. In his police record, it appears that Daniel had "bad behavior", spent 26 days in prison and 54 in detention, in addition to receiving 14 reprimands and two warnings, being considered inappropriate for the military police service according to the police bulletin. During his time as a police officer, he studied law at the Estácio de Sá University, completing the course in 2019.
He is also a teacher of muay thai and self-defense.

He was elected in the 2018 elections as a federal deputy for Rio de Janeiro for the 56th legislature of the Chamber of Deputies, through the PSL, with 31,789 votes (0.41% of those valid).

The politician became known because, before the 2018 elections, his video went viral on social media next to the state deputy elected by Rio de Janeiro, Rodrigo Amorim, in which both then candidates broke a plaque honoring Marielle Franco, councilwoman murdered on 14 March 2018, in the capital of Rio de Janeiro. In his defense, Silveira claimed that the sign had been removed because it covered the signaling of Praça Floriano Peixoto and to send a message to militant agents that they would not take over territory ostensibly and through vandalism.

Among the main votes in Congress, Daniel voted in favor on the following agendas: MP 867 (which, according to environmentalists, would amend the Forest Code amnesty for deforestation); MP 910 (known as MP da Grilagem); PL 3723, which regulates the practice of snipers and hunters; New Sanitation Legal Framework; church debt amnesty; Sergio Moro's "Anti-Crime Package"; Social Security Reform PEC; freezing of public servants' salaries (2020) and the convening of an Inter-American Convention against Racism.

Daniel voted against on the following guidelines: that those responsible for breaking dams should be criminalized; that teachers were outside the rules of the new Pension Reform; increase in the Party Fund and the possibility of alteration or decrease in the Electoral Fund.

In the regulation of the new FUNDEB, Daniel was absent in the first vote and in the second he voted against the allocation being only for public education.

In February 2021, after having his arrest decreed by the Federal Supreme Court and confirmed by the Chamber of Deputies, Silveira left the PSL and joined the Brazilian Labor Party (PTB), signing his membership card from inside the prison next to the acronym president, Roberto Jefferson.

Controversies

Pedro II School

On 11 October 2019, Rodrigo Amorim and Daniel Silveira, both from the PSL, went to Colégio Pedro II, in São Cristóvão to conduct an inspection for the "Education Crusade", which is undertaken by the two parliamentarians. Oscar Halac, dean of the institution, tried to prevent the entrance of the parliamentarians, because they did not have authorization. On the occasion, the rector spoke, showing his indignation with what happened, which demonstrated the lack of knowledge of the two parliamentarians about the rules of entry and exit of the institution, and questioned the attitude of the elected officials, who, in his opinion, would only be concerned with party-political interests. The rector communicated the event to the Federal Police, to analyze if there was an abuse of authority by the parliamentarians. Rodrigo Amorim said that the "Education Crusade" has no "ideological scope" and claimed to have found "strong indoctrination" in the places he visited. On 18 October 2019, it was reported by the newspaper O Globo that the board of Colégio Pedro II made a record of occurrence with the Federal Police. In the same month, it was announced that Daniel Silveira would have to respond to the case at the Federal Supreme Court (STF).

Journalist assault

In October 2019 Daniel Silveira was recorded on video discussing with journalist Guga Noblat. He throws the journalist's cell phone on the floor and says:
"I threw. What's up, brother? I hit you, asshole. Go to the STF and sue me. You're an asshole, boy."

The Brazilian Association of Investigative Journalism (Abraji) released a note against the deputy's action, stressing that the aggression action against journalist Guga Noblat was not an isolated case, referring to the case that occurred on 20 September 2019, when Daniel Silveira amplified pieces of misinformation about the magazine AzMina, criticizing virtually the work of the journalists who run the periodical. Abraji expressed solidarity with Guga Noblat and condemned the action of Daniel Silveira. The association also urged the Chamber of Deputies to take steps to determine whether there was a breach of parliamentary decorum and the application of appropriate sanctions.

PL on victims of Communism in Brazil

In October 2019, Daniel Silveira filed a Bill (PL) that aims to institute the National Day of Remembrance for the Victims of Communism in Brazil. The deputy did not mention the numbers of "genocides" in the country. He also suggested that there should be campaigns to "make Brazilians aware" of the "communist threat". Political scientist Eduardo Grin, of the Getúlio Vargas Foundation (FGV), called the PSL deputy's proposal "absurd" and denied the politician about historical facts related to communism.

Threats to the STF and TSE

In November 2019, after the decision of the Federal Supreme Court (STF) to veto the arrest at second instance, Daniel Silveira published on Twitter: "If you need a corporal, I am (Sic) available". The post is a reference to the statement by Eduardo Bolsonaro (PSL-SP), who said in his political campaign in 2018: "If you want to close the STF, do you know what you do? You don't even send a jeep. Send a soldier and a corporal (…) Take the power of the pen from the hand of an STF minister, what is he on the street?"

According to the survey of Aos Fatos in May 2020, Daniel Silveira and a group of seven deputies investigated in the fake news survey published an average of two posts per day on a social network over a period of three months, with disinformation or mentioning the STF in a different critical way.

In December 2020, the deputy again threatened the STF, and also the TSE, by defending the printed vote: "The printed vote will happen or else the STF and the Electoral Justice will no longer exist because we will not allow it". The deputy called the STF ministers marginals, and "kid", Luís Roberto Barroso, the president of the TSE.

Prison and release from jail by two times

On 16 February 2021, Daniel Silveira was arrested in flagrante delicto (???) by the Federal Police after publishing a video apologizing to the AI-5 and attacking the ministers of the Federal Supreme Court (STF). The arrest warrant was issued by Minister Alexandre de Moraes. The following day, the STF plenary session decided, by 11 votes to zero, to keep the congressman in prison.

On 19 February, the Chamber of Deputies maintained Silveira's prison by 364 votes to 130. Silveira left prison on 14 March 2021, to serve sentence at home after Moraes decision and will be monitored by an electronic anklet.
However, on June 24, he was arrested again for repeated violations of electronic monitoring, the arrest being revoked in November of the same year.

Electoral history

Bibliography

References

Notes

1982 births
Living people
People from Petrópolis
Far-right politics in Brazil
Brazilian Labour Party (current) politicians
Brazilian police officers
Members of the Chamber of Deputies (Brazil) from Rio de Janeiro (state)